Charles John Bradley (October 13, 1950 – October 8, 2022) was an American football tight end who played three seasons in the National Football League (NFL) with the San Diego Chargers and Chicago Bears. He was drafted by the Miami Dolphins in the second round of the 1973 NFL Draft as a guard and center, but never played for the Dolphins.  He was injured during the 1973 preseason and placed on injured reserve, and then waived by the Dolphins before the 1974 season. He played college football at the University of Oregon and attended Menlo-Atherton High School in Atherton, California. Bradley was also a member of the Southern California Sun of the World Football League. Bradley died five days before his 72nd birthday on October 8, 2022.

References

External links
Just Sports Stats

1950 births
2022 deaths
Players of American football from Illinois
American football tight ends
Oregon Ducks football players
Miami Dolphins players
Southern California Sun players
San Diego Chargers players
Chicago Bears players
People from Hinsdale, Illinois